The Silent Force is a 1970–1971 United States police drama television series about three United States Government undercover agents who fight organized crime starring Ed Nelson, Percy Rodriguez, and Lynda Day. It aired from September 21, 1970, to January 11, 1971.

Cast

Ed Nelson...Ward Fuller
Percy Rodriguez...Jason Hart
Lynda Day...Amelia Cole

Synopsis

Ward Fuller, Jason Hart, and Amelia Cole make up the Silent Force, a team of U.S. government agents assigned to work undercover to infiltrate organized crime in Southern California. Their various operations involve them with companies and individuals victimized by or taking part in organized crime.

Each episode of The Silent Force opens with this narrative: "'If you do not, on a national scale, attack organized criminals with weapons and techniques as effective as their own, they will destroy us'...Robert F. Kennedy. An attack has been mounted from Washington; an undercover team of federal agents is the spearhead of that attack: The Silent Force."

Production

Luther Davis created The Silent Force, and Walter Grauman was its executive producer. Grauman and Philip Barry, Jr. produced the show. Episode directors included Arnold Laven, George McCowan, and Gene Nelson. Writers included Davis, John Meredyth Lucas, Mark Rodgers, Donald S. Sanford, Jack Turley and the team of James D. Buchanan and Ronald Austin. Aaron Spelling Productions produced the show and Dominic Frontiere composed its music.

The Silent Force bore similarities to the hit CBS series Mission: Impossible. Coincidentally, Lynda Day (billed as Lynda Day George after her 1970 marriage to actor Christopher George) joined the cast of Mission: Impossible in 1971 after the cancellation of The Silent Force, and both Percy Rodriguez and Ed Nelson made guest appearances on the series (Rodriguez in season four's "Chico" and Nelson in season seven's "The Western").

A "novelization" of the series, also entitled The Silent Force and written by Harry Goddard, was published in 1971.

Broadcast history

The Silent Force premiered on ABC on September 21, 1970. It was cancelled after the broadcast of its fifteenth episode on January 11, 1971. It aired on Monday at 8:30 p.m. throughout its run.

Episodes

Sources

Notes

References

External links

1970 ABC promo for The Silent Force on YouTube

American Broadcasting Company original programming
1970 American television series debuts
1971 American television series endings
1970s American crime drama television series
English-language television shows
Television shows set in California
Television series by CBS Studios